Ešarra-ḫammat (meaning "Ešarra is mistress") was a queen of the Neo-Assyrian Empire as the primary consort of Esarhaddon (681–669 BC). Ešarra-ḫammat had been married to Esarhaddon for over a decade by the time he became king, having married him  695 BC. Few sources from Ešarra-ḫammat's lifetime that mention her are known and she is thus chiefly known from sources dating to after her death in February 672 BC, an event which deeply affected Esarhaddon. Esarhaddon had a great mausoleum constructed for her, unusual for burials of Assyrian queens, and had her death recorded in the Babylonian Chronicles. Ešarra-ḫammat might have been the mother of Esarhaddon's most prominent children, i.e. the daughter Šērūʾa-ēṭirat and the sons Ashurbanipal and Shamash-shum-ukin.

Life 
Ešarra-ḫammat married Esarhaddon  695 BC. According to the Austrian British Assyriologist Gwendolyn Leick, Ešarra-ḫammat might have been of Babylonian ancestry. Ešarra-ḫammat is known mainly from commemorative documents and inscriptions written after her death. Among the few known inscriptions written by Ešarra-ḫammat (i.e. written when she was alive) is an inscription on an eye-stone marking it as her property.

Ešarra-ḫammat's name translated literally means "Ešarra is mistress". Ešarra was a temple, and in Mesopotamian cosmology, the name Ešarra was also applied to a heavenly cosmic location. The name is perhaps best interpreted as "[Mullissu of] Ešarra is mistress", referencing the goddess associated with the temple/realm. Alternative translations and interpretations include the name just referring to the temple/realm itself, or that it should be read "[Mullissu of] Ešarra gathers [all the powers]" or "[In] Ešarra, she is mistress". Given that no other individual by the name Ešarra-ḫammat is known, it is possible that the name was assumed by the future queen upon her marriage to Esarhaddon.

Ešarra-ḫammat died, probably aged about 40, in February 672 BC. She is the only known queen of Esarhaddon. Although Esarhaddon was also only about 40, and would rule for a few more years, no incumbent queen is known from the sources after his death, and the position is obviously absent from preserved lists of officials from this time. The death of Ešarra-ḫammat, which had shortly before been preceded by the death of one of their infant children, sunk Esarhaddon into depression, and he did not choose a new queen. Instead, some of the queen's responsibilities and duties were assigned to Esarhaddon's mother, Naqiʾa. Though there are two surviving accounts of Ešarra-ḫammat's funeral and the rituals performed for her, her grave has not yet been located. This grave was not just a simple site, or placed within the palace (as was the case for some earlier queens); Esarhaddon had a great mausoleum constructed for Ešarra-ḫammat and he had her death recorded in the Babylonian Chronicles.

It is known that Esarhaddon had other wives than Ešarra-ḫammat, as his succession documents distinguish between the sons of "Ashurbanipal's mother" (Ashurbanipal being his son and successor) and the other sons. It is as such not known for certain which among Esarhaddon's at least 18 children were also Ešarra-ḫammat's children. It is possible that Esarhaddon's most prominent children, the eldest daughter Šērūʾa-ēṭirat and the sons Ashurbanipal and Shamash-shum-ukin, were Ešarra-ḫammat's children. Ešarra-ḫammat's funeral was a grand affair, in which multiple distinguished women from the court and elsewhere partook, including Ešarra-ḫammat's "daughter" and "daughter-in-law". I 2013, the Assyriologist David Kertai assumed the daughter referenced to be Šērūʾa-ēṭirat, and suggested that the daughter-in-law could be Libbāli-šarrat, the wife of Ashurbanipal.

At some point after Ashurbanipal was proclaimed Esarhaddon's heir later in 672 BC, three months after Ešarra-ḫammat's death, Esarhaddon's chief exorcist Adad-šumu-uṣur reported to the king that Ešarra-ḫammat's ghost had appeared to Ashurbanipal to confirm his status as heir. Partially quoting Ashurbanipal's words, Adad-šumu-uṣur presented the following account:

Notes

References

Bibliography 

 

 

 
 

 

 

Neo-Assyrian Empire
Sargonid dynasty
8th-century BC births
672 BC deaths
Ancient Assyrians
Ancient Mesopotamian women
Assyrian queens
8th-century BC people